Flight 261 may refer to:

 Alaska Airlines Flight 261, a crash into the Pacific Ocean off California in 2000
 Golden West Airlines Flight 261, a mid-air collision in Whittier, California in 1975
 Thai Airways Flight 261, a crash landing in Thailand in 1998

0261